Kerala Kalamandalam,  deemed to be University of Art and Culture by the Government of India, is a major center for learning Indian performing arts, especially those that developed in the Southern states of India, with the special emphasis on Kerala. It is situated in the small town of Cheruthuruthy in Thrissur, Thrissur District on the banks of the Bharathapuzha river.

History
The inception of Kalamandalam gave a second life to three major classical dance performing arts of Kerala as Kathakali, Kudiyattam and Mohiniyattam were, by the turn of the 20th century, facing the threat of extinction under various regulations of the colonial authorities. It was at this juncture, in 1927, that Vallathol Narayana Menon and Mukunda Raja came forward and formed a society called Kerala Kalamandalam. They solicited donations from the public and conducted a lottery in order to raise funds for this society. Kerala Kalamandalam was inaugurated in November 1930 at Kunnamkulam, Kakkad, and was later shifted to the village of Cheruthuruthy, just south of Shoranur, in 1936. The Maharaja of Cochin donated land and a building. Subsequently, a dance department was started to revive Mohiniyattom.
Kerala Kalamandalam has been functioning as a grant-in-aid institution under the Cultural Affairs Department, Government of Kerala. In 2006, the Kalamandalam was accorded the status of 'Deemed University for Art and Culture' by the Government of India. In 2010, University Grants Commission (India) has given 'A' category status for Kerala Kalamandalam. Kalamandalam is the only deemed university in Kerala state accorded the prestigious status.

Visits by prime ministers 
The first Prime Minister to visit Kerala Kalamandalam is Jawaharlal Nehru in 1955 for the Silver Jubilee of the Kerala Kalamandalam. Indira Gandhi was the second Prime Minister to visit Kerala Kalamandalam in 1980 and V. P. Singh in 1990. Manmohan Singh is the fourth Prime Minister to visit Kerala Kalamandalam in September 2012.

Courses
Kalamandalam imparts training in classical dance and theatre forms like Kathakali, Mohiniyattam, Kudiyattam, Thullal, Kuchipudi, Bharatanatyam, and Nangiar Koothu, besides the traditional orchestra called Panchavadyam. Training is also given in various percussion instruments like chenda, maddalam and mizhavu. Kalamandalam follows the gurukula sampradayam, the ancient Indian education system based on residential tutelage. Kalamandalam was conceived to provide training to its students in the Gurukula Sampradaya, an ancient tradition of residential schooling where students stayed with the teachers. The first vice chancellor of kerala kalamandalam was K G Paulose (2007) and the last chairman of Kerala Kalamandalam was O.N.V.Kurup. Present vice chancellor is T K Narayanan.

Former chairpersons
The following is a list of Chairpersons/Vice chancellors of Kerala kalamandalam.

The Government of India, on the advice of the University Grants Commission declared Keralakalamandalam as deemed University as per order No. F9 -11/99 U3 dated 14-03-2006. The Government of Kerala approved the Memorandum of Association and Rules and subsequently the title "Chairman" was substituted by "Vice-Chancellor" (since 2007)

See also 
 Panchavadyam
 Kerala Folklore Akademy
 List of Kerala State Government Organizations

References

External links

 Official Website 
 OpenArt India - Confederation of Indian Artists, Fine Arts and Crafts.

Kathakali
Mohiniyattam
Deemed universities in India
Performing arts education in India
Art schools in India
Dance schools in India
Universities in Kerala
Universities and colleges in Thrissur district
Educational institutions established in 1930
1930 establishments in India